Marie Ennemond Camille Jordan (5 January 1838 – 22 January 1922) was a French mathematician, known both for his foundational work in group theory and for his influential Cours d'analyse.

Biography
Jordan was born in Lyon and educated at the École polytechnique. He was an engineer by profession; later in life he taught at the École polytechnique and the Collège de France, where he had a reputation for eccentric choices of notation.

He is remembered now by name in a number of results:

 The Jordan curve theorem, a topological result required in complex analysis
 The Jordan normal form and the Jordan matrix in linear algebra
 In mathematical analysis, Jordan measure (or Jordan content) is an area measure that predates measure theory
 In group theory, the Jordan–Hölder theorem on composition series is a basic result.
 Jordan's theorem on finite linear groups

Jordan's work did much to bring Galois theory into the mainstream. He also investigated the Mathieu groups, the first examples of sporadic groups. His Traité des substitutions, on permutation groups, was published in 1870; this treatise won for Jordan the 1870 prix Poncelet. He was an Invited Speaker of the ICM in 1920 in Strasbourg.

Camille Jordan is not to be confused with the geodesist Wilhelm Jordan (Gauss–Jordan elimination) or the physicist Pascual Jordan (Jordan algebras).

Bibliography
 Cours d'analyse de l'Ecole Polytechnique ; 1 Calcul différentiel (Gauthier-Villars, 1909)
 Cours d'analyse de l'Ecole Polytechnique ; 2 Calcul intégral (Gauthier-Villars, 1909)
 Cours d'analyse de l'Ecole Polytechnique ; 3 équations différentielles (Gauthier-Villars, 1909)
   Mémoire sur le nombre des valeurs des fonctions  (1861–1869)
 Recherches sur les polyèdres (Gauthier-Villars, 1866)
 
 
 The collected works of Camille Jordan were published 1961–1964 in four volumes at Gauthier-Villars, Paris.

See also
Centered tree
Frenet–Serret formulas
Pochhammer contour

References

External links

 

1838 births
1922 deaths
École Polytechnique alumni
Mines Paris - PSL alumni
Corps des mines
Scientists from Lyon
19th-century French mathematicians
Group theorists
Linear algebraists
Academic staff of the Collège de France
Corresponding members of the Saint Petersburg Academy of Sciences
Members of the French Academy of Sciences
Foreign Members of the Royal Society
Foreign associates of the National Academy of Sciences
Members of the Ligue de la patrie française